Der Hund von Baskerville is a 1914 German silent film adaptation of Arthur Conan Doyle's 1902 novel The Hound of the Baskervilles, the first film adaptation of the work. According to the website silentera.com, the film was considered lost, but has been rediscovered; the Russian Gosfilmofond film archive possesses a print, while the Filmmuseum München has a 35mm positive print.

Plot summary

Cast
 Alwin Neuß as Sherlock Holmes
 Friedrich Kühne as Stapleton
 Hanni Weisse as Laura Lyons
 Erwin Fichtner as Henry von Baskerville
 Andreas Van Horn as Barrymore - Kammerdiener

History
In 1907, Richard Oswald mounted a version of The Hound of the Baskervilles in Praterstraße based on Der Hund von Baskerville: Schauspiel in vier Aufzügen aus dem Schottischen Hochland. Frei nach Motiven aus Poes und Doyles Novellen (The Hound of the Baskervilles: a play in four acts set in the Scottish Highlands. Freely adapted from the stories of Poe and Doyle) which was written by Ferdinand Bonn.

By 1914, Oswald was working as a script supervisor  at Union-Vitascope studios in the Weißensee Studios. Films based on mystery novels were very successful in German cinema at the time so Oswald found himself in the position to pen a film script based on The Hound of the Baskervilles.

Production
Richard Oswald penned the tale which blended Doyle's original story and Der Hund von Baskerville and Rudolf Meinert was tasked with the direction.

Alwin Neuß was cast to portray Sherlock Holmes in Der Hund von Baskerville. Neuß had previously played the role in 1910's Das Milliontestament.

Der Hund von Baskerville was so successful, it spawned five more films: Das einsame Haus, Das unheimliche Zimmer, Die Sage vom Hund von Baskerville, Dr. MacDonalds Sanatorium, and Das Haus ohne Fenster. Neuß played Holmes in the first three sequels, but was replaced in the last two by Erich Kaiser-Titz.

Cast 
 Alwin Neuß as Sherlock Holmes
 Friedrich Kühne as Stapleton
 Hanni Weisse as Laura Lyons
 Erwin Fichter as Henry von Baskerville
 Andreas von Horn as Barrymore
 Unknown as Dr. Watson

See also
 List of rediscovered films

References

External links
 
 Der Hund von Baskerville

Films based on The Hound of the Baskervilles
Films of the German Empire
German silent feature films
Films directed by Rudolf Meinert
1910s rediscovered films
German black-and-white films
Sherlock Holmes films
German mystery films
1910s mystery films
Rediscovered German films
Silent mystery films
Silent thriller films
Films shot at Weissensee Studios
1910s German films